EE2 may refer to:

Empire Earth II, a 2005 video game
Enemy Engaged 2, a 2007 video game
Ethinylestradiol, a steroid hormone, also known as EE2
Praktica EE 2, a camera